The USA South Athletic Conference men's basketball tournament (formerly the Dixie Intercollegiate Athletic Conference men's basketball tournament) is the annual conference basketball championship tournament for the NCAA Division III USA South Athletic Conference. The tournament has been held annually since 1964, when the conference was still known as the Dixie Intercollegiate Athletic Conference. It is a single-elimination tournament and seeding is based on regular season records.

The winner receives the USA South's automatic bid to the NCAA Men's Division III Basketball Championship.

Results

Divisional tournaments

Championship records

 Brevard, Mary Baldwin, and Southern Virginia have yet to advance to the USA South tournament final
 Berea and Chowan never reached the tournament finals while members of the USA South
 Schools highlighted in pink are former members of the USA South

References

NCAA Division III men's basketball conference tournaments
Basketball Tournament, Men's
Recurring sporting events established in 1998